Sadıqlı (also, Sadıxlı) is a village and municipality in the Agstafa Rayon of Azerbaijan next to the Azerbaijan–Georgia border. It has a population of 2,849.

References 

Populated places in Aghstafa District